UFC Fight Night: Blaydes vs. dos Santos (also known as UFC Fight Night 166 and UFC on ESPN+ 24) was a mixed martial arts event produced by the Ultimate Fighting Championship that took place on January 25, 2020 at PNC Arena in Raleigh, North Carolina, United States.

Background
The event was the first that the promotion hosted in Raleigh and first in North Carolina since UFC on Fox: Jacaré vs. Brunson 2 in January 2018.

A heavyweight bout between Curtis Blaydes and former UFC Heavyweight Champion Junior dos Santos served as the event headliner.

A bantamweight bout was scheduled between former UFC Lightweight Champion Frankie Edgar and Cory Sandhagen at the event. However, Edgar was withdrawn from the fight in favour of facing Chan Sung Jung in a featherweight bout at UFC Fight Night: Edgar vs. The Korean Zombie after Jung's original opponent, former featherweight title challenger Brian Ortega, pulled out due to a knee injury. In turn, Sandhagen was removed from the card and expected to be rescheduled for a future event after promotion officials deemed that a suitable opponent could not be arranged.

A middleweight bout between Bevon Lewis and Alen Amedovski was scheduled to take place at the event. However, Amedovski was forced to pull out of the event citing injury and was replaced by Dequan Townsend.

A strawweight bout between Hannah Cifers and Brianna Van Buren was scheduled to take place at the event. However, Van Buren was pulled from the event due to undisclosed reasons and replaced by former Invicta FC Strawweight Champion Angela Hill.

Featherweight fighters Josh Emmett and Nad Narimani pulled out of their scheduled fights against Arnold Allen and Nik Lentz respectively, citing injuries. As a result, Allen and Lentz faced each other at the event.

Results

Bonus awards
The following fighters received $50,000 bonuses.
Fight of the Night: Brett Johns vs. Tony Gravely
Performance of the Night: Alex Perez and Herbert Burns

See also 

 List of UFC events
 List of current UFC fighters
 2020 in UFC

References 
 

UFC Fight Night
2020 in mixed martial arts
2020 in sports in North Carolina
Mixed martial arts in North Carolina
Sports competitions in Raleigh, North Carolina
January 2020 sports events in the United States